Delaplaine McDaniel School is a historic K-8 school located in the Point Breeze neighborhood of Philadelphia, Pennsylvania. It is part of the School District of Philadelphia. The building was designed by Irwin T. Catharine and built in 1935–1937. It is a three-story, 16 bay, yellow brick building in the Art Deco-style. It features three zigzag brick and limestone panels, brick pilasters with stepped capitals, and entrances with limestone pilasters. The school was named for the Philadelphia Quaker iron ore manufacturer and merchant Delaplaine McDaniel (1817–1885), who left funds for the establishment of the school.

The building was added to the National Register of Historic Places in 1986.

Residents zoned to McDaniel are zoned to South Philadelphia High School.

Gallery

References

External links

School buildings on the National Register of Historic Places in Philadelphia
Art Deco architecture in Pennsylvania
School buildings completed in 1937
School District of Philadelphia
South Philadelphia
Public K–8 schools in Philadelphia